Sontyam is a neighbourhood in the city of Visakhapatnam, state of Andhra Pradesh, India. It is a suburb of the city.

About
It is on the North side of city and it is famous for chicken which is called for Sontyam Chicken.

Transport
Sontyam is well connected with Madhurawada, Maddilapalem.

APSRTC routes

References

Neighbourhoods in Visakhapatnam